Baruch Spinoza (1632–1677) was a Dutch philosopher.

Spinoza may also refer to:

 Spinoza (book), a 1951 book by Stuart Hampshire
 Spinoza: Practical Philosophy, a 1970 book by Gilles Deleuze
 Spinoza Prize (Spinozapremie), the highest scientific award in the Netherlands
 7142 Spinoza, a main-belt asteroid
  Spinoza (beetle), a beetle genus of the family Cleridae (checkered beetles)

See also
 Spinosa (disambiguation)
 Espinoza (disambiguation)
 David Spinozza, American guitarist and producer